"Have I Got a Deal for You" is a song written by Michael P. Heeney and Jackson Leap, and recorded by American country music artist Reba McEntire.  It was released in June 1985 as the first single and title track from the album Have I Got a Deal for You.  The song reached #6 on the Billboard Hot Country Singles & Tracks chart.

Chart performance

References

1985 singles
1985 songs
Reba McEntire songs
Song recordings produced by Jimmy Bowen
MCA Records singles
Songs written by Michael P. Heeney